The word Atigun can refer to one of several place names in Alaska.

Atigun Gorge a valley east of Galbraith Lake
Atigun Pass, a high mountain pass across the Brooks Range
Atigun River, a river in the Endicott Mountains